Frank Joseph Whaley (born July 20, 1963) is an American actor, film director, screenwriter, and comedian. His roles include Brett in Pulp Fiction, Robby Krieger in The Doors, young Archie "Moonlight" Graham in Field of Dreams, and Guy in Swimming With Sharks. He has also appeared in films and TV series such as Born on the Fourth of July, The Freshman, A Midnight Clear, Swing Kids, Broken Arrow, Luke Cage, and World Trade Center.

Early life
Whaley was born and raised in Syracuse, New York, the son of Robert W. Whaley, Sr. and Josephine (née Timilione). Whaley graduated from Anthony A. Henninger High School in 1981 and left home at 18. He graduated from the University at Albany.

Career
Whaley made his film debut in 1987's Ironweed. In 1989 he appeared in Field of Dreams and Born on the Fourth of July. The latter film began a long collaboration with director Oliver Stone, including 1991's The Doors, in which he played Robby Krieger, and, in the same year, JFK, in which he played a conspirator in the JFK assassination. Krieger himself reported that he was pleased with the way Whaley portrayed him. In 1990, Whaley appeared with Marlon Brando and Matthew Broderick in The Freshman. In 1991, he starred in the John Hughes feature film Career Opportunities.

Over the next two years, he played supporting roles in movies such as Hoffa and Swing Kids. He appeared in his second leading film role in 1994's Swimming with Sharks. During the same year, he played a supporting role as the doomed Brett, who was memorably killed by Samuel L. Jackson's and John Travolta's characters in Pulp Fiction.

In 1998, he started a regular role on the short-lived CBS series Buddy Faro. He also appeared in episodes of The Dead Zone, Law & Order, and its spinoff Law & Order: Criminal Intent.

Whaley made his writing-directorial debut in his independent film, Joe the King, in 1999, featuring his Doors costar Val Kilmer and longtime friend and colleague Ethan Hawke in starring roles. The film premiered at the Sundance Film Festival and earned Whaley the Waldo Salt Screenwriting Award. His second film as writer and director, The Jimmy Show, stars Whaley and Carla Gugino. This film also premiered at the Sundance Film Festival.

Whaley's third film as writer and director, New York City Serenade, starring Chris Klein and Freddie Prinze Jr., premiered at the 2007 Toronto International Film Festival. He stars as the villain in the 2007 horror film Vacancy. In 2014 he wrote and directed the film  Like Sunday, Like Rain, starring Debra Messing, Leighton Meester and Billie Joe Armstrong. The film won six awards at the 2014 Williamsburg Independent Film Festival including Best Film, Best Director and acting nods for Armstrong, Meester, Messing and Julian Shatkin. It opened in March 2015.

In 2014, Whaley appeared as Van Miller in Season One of the Showtime series Ray Donovan. In 2016, Whaley had a role in Paramount Animation's first mostly live-action film, Monster Trucks, and in 2017, he appeared in the teen film The Outskirts.

Whaley's other film credits include World Trade Center, Red Dragon, Rob the Mob, School of Rock, Broken Arrow, Little Monsters, A Midnight Clear, Janie Jones, I.Q. among others.

His television credits include Gotham, The Blacklist, CSI, Curb Your Enthusiasm, Psych, Burn Notice, Ugly Betty, Mrs. Harris, When Trumpets Fade, Boston Legal, Medium, Blue Bloods, Bull, House, MacGyver, Divorce, Elementary, Under the Dome, the TV mini-series Madoff, Alcatraz and many others.

Whaley has maintained his roots in the theater, working frequently with The New Group in New York City. In 2011, he appeared in the New Group's revival of Wallace Shawn's Marie And Bruce opposite Marisa Tomei.

Personal life
In 2001, Whaley married Heather Bucha Whaley, an actress and writer, and the author of Eat Your Feelings: Recipes for Self-Loathing. They have two children: Buster Whaley and Tallulah Whaley.

Filmography

As director

Film roles

TV roles

References

External links
 
 
 

1963 births
20th-century American male actors
21st-century American male actors
American film directors
American male film actors
American male television actors
Living people
Male actors from New York (state)
Male actors from Syracuse, New York
People from Syracuse, New York
University at Albany, SUNY alumni